WEDG (103.3 MHz) is a commercial FM radio radio station in Buffalo, New York, serving Western New York.  It is owned by Cumulus Media and calls itself "103.3 The Edge," broadcasting an alternative rock radio format. The studios and offices are on the east side of Buffalo on James E. Casey Drive.

WEDG has an effective radiated power (ERP) of 49,000 watts, just short of the 50 kw maximum for most stations in New York.  The transmitter is on Kensington Avenue, near the Kensington Expressway (New York State Route 33).

History

WYSL-FM, WPHD, WUFX
WYSL-FM was the FM counterpart to WYSL 1400 AM, now known as WWWS. The station switched its call sign to WPHD in 1979. WPHD mostly simulcast WYSL but played free form progressive rock overnight. The rock format caught on with listeners, prompting WPHD to go with a full time rock sound. This format made WPHD popular, along with its morning duo, Robert W. Taylor and Harv Moore, whose show ran from 1978 to 1989.

On September 23, 1989, the station changed call signs from WPHD to WUFX, "103.3 The Fox". Taylor and Moore were fired and a new morning drive time show debuted, "Shredd and Ragan".  Shredd coming from AM 1400 WXBX. The format lasted about six years. Both Taylor and Moore eventually were hired at WHTT-FM, which is now WEDG's sister station. Taylor is now retired and Moore went on to stints at WECK, WHLD, and then back to WECK.  Taylor later served as WECK's imaging voice.

WEDG
On June 23, 1995, the station adopted an alternative rock format and the call sign and branding as WEDG "103.3 The Edge". At the time, Toronto radio station 102.1 CFNY-FM was making inroads in Western New York, and also rebranded itself "The Edge" shortly after the sign-on of WEDG.  Because CFNY is a Canadian radio station, it was outside Jacobs Media's trademark on "The Edge" radio brand for U.S. stations.

After some time playing alternative, WEDG began leaning towards a harder edged active rock direction in 2005 after then-rival 92.9 WBUF flipped from active rock to hot talk.  After a few years, WEDG rotated in more "classic" hard rock/heavy metal artists alongside current and recent releases in the station playlist.  WEDG was limited in how much classic material it could play, to avoid cannibalizing listeners from classic rock sister station, 96.9 WGRF.  WEDG began streaming on the Internet in 2006.

Beginning in late 2014, WEDG began shifting from active rock, back to the station's heritage alternative rock roots, while still maintaining a few active rock songs in rotation. By the beginning of 2016, WEDG dropped the "Rock Radio" prefix and re-imaged the station as "Buffalo. Rock. Alternative.", reflecting a nearly 25-year tenure as Buffalo's modern rock outlet. The station usually has top ratings for Men 25-49 in the Buffalo radio market.

Sports coverage
For years, WEDG was the co-flagship of the Buffalo Bills Radio Network with sister station 96.9 WGRF.  Parent company Cumulus Media decided not to renew the contract with the Bills' network at the end of 2011. It was announced on January 4, 2012, that the Bills would move to Entercom Communications station WGR 550 AM starting with the 2012-2013 NFL season.

In 2015, WEDG picked up the NFL on Westwood One in a simulcast deal with sister station WHLD 1270 AM.

The Shredd and Ragan Show
Shredd and Ragan were longest-serving personalities at the station, hosting the morning drive time shift from 1994. They were moved from mornings after 12 years to make way for the syndicated "Opie and Anthony" show from New York City.  That marked a homecoming for Gregg "Opie" Hughes, who was a former WUFX staffer.  After O&A was dropped from the schedule in July 2008, Program Director (then known as) "Evil" Jim Kurdziel hosted the morning shift on an interim basis until August 25, 2008, when midday host Rich "Bull" Gaenzler was named the permanent host.  It was announced in early January 2012 that the Shredd and Ragan show was returning to mornings starting January 9, 2012.

Shredd and Ragan were reassigned to WGRF in August 2021. Cassiday Proctor and Anthony Wise were named the replacement morning team four months later.  Their show is called “Cass & Anthony".

References

External links
Official WEDG Website

FMQB's 2008 Year End Leaders

EDG
Cumulus Media radio stations
Radio stations established in 1947
1947 establishments in New York (state)
Alternative rock radio stations in the United States